Maladroit is the fourth studio album by American rock band Weezer, released on May 14, 2002, by Geffen Records. Produced by the band, it was their first album to feature bassist Scott Shriner, following the departure of former bassist Mikey Welsh in 2001. Musically, the album features heavy metal riffs uncommon to Weezer's previous releases.

Maladroit received positive reviews from critics and was ranked number 90 in a Rolling Stone readers' poll of top albums. The album debuted and peaked at number three on the Billboard 200, selling 152,000 copies its first week. As of 2022, the album has sold 605,000 copies in the United States and was certified Gold by the RIAA a month after its release. Two singles were released from the album: "Dope Nose" and "Keep Fishin'".

Background and recording
For the band's fourth studio album, Weezer attempted to incorporate an innovative system in which the group would release demos in MP3 format on the band's website every day while in the studio working on Maladroit. This resulted in dozens of different versions of over thirty different songs circulating on the Internet before the album was released.

The idea was to keep communication open with the band's fan base on the group's official message board as well as, more crucially, on unofficial message boards such as the Rivers Correspondent Board (which was closed to the public at frontman Rivers Cuomo's request, chiefly so that members of the press could not gain access). Yet frontman Rivers Cuomo and the fans strongly disagreed on a number of creative aspects of the album. One thing they did agree on was bringing back the summer 2000 song "Slob" for use on the album. Cuomo commented, "I never would have thought to put the song 'Slob' on the record if the fans did not request it. Scott Shriner also wanted a hidden track, 'Are You Gonna Be?,' for the album." Regardless of disagreements, Weezer fans are still "specially thanked" in the album's liner notes and the album title itself was suggested by a board member on the Weezer message boards who went by the screen name of Lethe.

The band's uploading of MP3 demos onto its website resulted in some radio stations playing the still unreleased (and sometimes unfinished) songs. Due to a spat between Cuomo and the record label Geffen/Interscope, Weezer self-funded the recordings for Maladroit and the label was unaware of the recordings at all until the radio began to play them. It is said that Cuomo was so excited for fans to hear the music he personally mailed copies of 8 out of the 13 songs on Maladroit to key radio stations and press outlets. In the week it was leaked to radio stations, the lead single "Dope Nose" reached #25 on Billboard's Modern Rock Tracks chart without an official single having been issued.

The airplay resulted in a gag order being issued by Geffen Records in which they requested that Weezer return the master tapes from the Maladroit sessions and apologize to each radio station that played the song. The band members resisted, citing that they had funded all the sessions themselves and that apologizing seemed pointless. The fans resisted as well, forming an online group called "Unreleased Weezer for the Masses" that rallied for the release of the album.

The hit songs "Dope Nose" and "Hash Pipe" (off The Green Album) were both written using the same method on the same night, with Rivers Cuomo allegedly taking "a bunch of Ritalin and ... like three shots of tequila" and pacing around for a while before writing both songs.

Packaging
The album's first 600,000 copies were specifically numbered with the number located on the back of the CD case near the lower right-hand corner.

Maladroit was the first Weezer album to be released in the Enhanced CD format, which contained bonus videos including live and studio footage, as well as a video of drummer Patrick Wilson riding a skateboard down stadium ramps.

Critical reception

Maladroit received generally favorable reviews. At Metacritic, which assigns a weighted average rating out of 100 to reviews from mainstream critics, the album received an average score of 72. Stephen Thomas Erlewine of AllMusic gave the album four stars, saying that it "retains the high quality of The Green Album". PopMatters gave the album an eight out of ten, saying "Maladroit keeps it short, keeps it simple, keeps it honest, but also importantly, they keep it coming. Thank Weezer for that." However, IGN later gave the album a score of five out of ten, and called it a "mixed bag", stating, "If you want to listen to a terrific Weezer cover band, proceed directly to Maladroit. Going by title alone, it's exactly as advertised. But, please, in the future, let's leave Weezer to their own devices. Ours aren't working."

Spin ended up calling it the 6th best album of 2002, and Rolling Stone readers voted it as the 8th best of the year. In another Rolling Stone readers poll, it was voted the 90th greatest album of all time.

In June 2009, Magnet had an article on the five most overrated and underrated Weezer songs. "All of Maladroit" was ranked number one on the list of the underrated half, where they comment "Maladroit, the band’s fourth album, is actually really good: not exactly deep, but it has some really stellar pop songs ... Sure, Maladroit never became a cultural touchstone the way the band’s first two albums did, but it deserves more credit than it ever got."

Track listing

The European and Australian version of Maladroit features "Island in the Sun" from The Green Album as a bonus track. Some of the European issues also contain the otherwise unavailable "Living Without You", sequenced between "December" and "Island in the Sun".

Personnel
Weezer
Rivers Cuomo – lead vocals, guitar
Pat Wilson – drums
Brian Bell – guitar, backing vocals
Scott Shriner – bass guitar, backing vocals

Additional personnel
Weezer – producer
Chad Bamford – additional production, engineer
Rod Cervera – additional production
Jordan Schur – executive producer
Tom Lord-Alge – mixing
Christopher Carroll – additional engineering
Carlos "Loco" Bedoya – additional engineering
Femio Hernández – assistant engineer
Darren Mora – assistant engineer
Steven P. Robillard – assistant engineer
Stephen Marcussen – mastering
Karl Koch – "Farm Hand"

Charts

Weekly charts

Year-end charts

Singles

Certifications

References

External links

Maladroit at YouTube (streamed copy where licensed)
 

2002 albums
Weezer albums
Geffen Records albums